Josef Kalousek (2 April 1838 – 22 November 1915), was a Czech historian and professor of Czech history at Univerzita Karlova in Prague.

Life
Josef Kalousek was born in a poor farmer family in Vamberk.

Work

Bibliography in Czech
  České státní právo (1871)
  Nástin životopisu Františka Palackého (1876)
  Karel IV., Otec vlasti (1878)
  Děje Královské České společnosti nauk (1885)
  Tři historické mapy k dějinám českým (1885)
  Výklad k historické mapě Čech (1894)
  O vůdčích myšlenkách v historickém díle Františka Palackého (1896)
  Obrana knížete Václava Svatého proti smyšlenkám a křivým úsudkům o jeho povaze (1901)
  O potřebě prohloubiti vědomosti o Husovi a jeho době (1915)

Bibliography in German
 Einige Grundlagen des böhmischen Staatsrechts. Prag 1871.
 Die Behandlung der Geschichte Přemysl Otakars II in Professor O. Lorenz' Deutscher Geschichte im 13. und 14. Jahrhundert. Prag 1874.
 Geschichte der Königlichen Böhmischen Gesellschaft der Wissenschaften: sammt einer kritischen Übersicht ihrer Publicationen aus dem Bereiche der Philosophie, Geschichte und Philologie, aus Anlass des hundertjährigen Jubelfestes der Gesellschaft 1884 in ihrem Auftrage verfaßt von Josef Kalousek. Prag: Königlich Böhmische Ges. der Wiss., 1884.

Articles in magazines
 O historii výtvarného umění v Čechách, Osvěta (1877)
 O zřízení a původu obce velkoruské (1880)
 O historii kalicha v dobách předhusitských, Výroční školní zpráva nižšího reálného gymnasia v Praze III, (1881)
 Jan z Jenštejna – archiepiscopus Pragensis, Zprávy KČSN (1882)
 Historie a materialismus, ČČM (1883)
 O staročeském právě dědickém a královském právě odúmrtním na statcích svobodných v Čechách i v Moravě, Rozpravy České akademie  (1894)
 Řády selské a instrukce hospodářské, Archiv Český, sv. 5.

Biografie
 Josef Pekař: Josef Kalousek 1838–1915, Český časopis historický 22/1916, (1916)
 Otakar Josek: Život a dílo Josefa Kalouska, Praha (1922)
 K. Kazbunda: Stolice dějin na pražské univerzitě II–III, (1965, 1968)
 F. Kutnar: Přehledné dějiny českého a slovenského dějepisectví, (1973)

References
 Josef Kalousek – in Czech

1838 births
1915 deaths
People from Vamberk
Academic staff of Charles University
20th-century Czech historians
19th-century Czech historians